Dong-woo or Dong-u is a Korean masculine given name. The meaning differs based on the hanja used to write each syllable of the name. There are 24 hanja with the reading "dong" and 42 hanja with the reading "woo" on the South Korean government's official list of hanja which may be registered for use in given names.

People with this name include:

 Jang Dong-woo (born 1990), South Korean singer, member of Infinite
 Kim Dong-woo (born 1988), South Korean football player
 Kim Dong-woo (skier) (born 1995), South Korean alpine skier
 Seok Dong-woo (born 1990), South Korean football player
 Shin Dong-woo (actor) (born 1998), South Korean actor
 CNU (singer) (birth name Shin Dong-woo, born 1991), South Korean singer, member of B1A4

See also
 List of Korean given names

References

Korean masculine given names